John E. Clancy was an American soldier who served with the 1st Artillery Regiment. He was awarded the Medal of Honor for bravery at the Battle of Wounded Knee, now called the Wounded Knee Massacre.

Service
Born in New York and raised in Washington, Clancy enlisted in Company E, 1st Artillery Regiment on August 2, 1887 (giving his age as 19) at "Vanco Bks" (possibly Vancouver Barracks). On December 29, 1890, Clancy was present at the Battle of Wounded Knee and was cited for bravery in twice voluntarily rescuing wounded comrades from under enemy fire; he was later awarded the Medal of Honor for his actions. He was discharged at Fort Sheridan, Illinois on August 1, 1892, as a private. Clancy re-enlisted in Company E on August 14, 1892, still at Fort Sheridan, and was dishonorably discharged at Fort Sheridan on September 26, 1894.

Citation
December 29, 1890 Private (then musician) John Clancy, Battery E, 1st Artillery: For bravery in twice voluntarily rescuing wounded comrades from under fire of the enemy during action against hostile Sioux Indians at Wounded Knee Creek, South Dakota. (Medal of Honor)

References

1860s births
Date of birth unknown
1932 deaths
United States Army soldiers
Military personnel from Washington (state)
American military personnel of the Indian Wars
United States Army Medal of Honor recipients
American Indian Wars recipients of the Medal of Honor
Pine Ridge Campaign